ABX Air, Inc., formerly Airborne Express, is a cargo airline headquartered at Wilmington Air Park near the City of Wilmington, Ohio, USA. ABX Air operates scheduled, ad hoc charter and ACMI (Aircraft, Crew, Maintenance and Insurance) freight services. It also provides flight support services and training. ABX Air is owned by Air Transport Services Group.

ABX Air's main customer is DHL, and the majority of the freight it carries is for that company. Many of ABX Air's aircraft are painted with DHL's yellow and red livery.

ABX also operated cargo flights on behalf of Air Jamaica between Miami and the two Jamaican cities of Montego Bay (Donald Sangster International Airport) and Kingston (Norman Manley International Airport). One of their Boeing 767-200s routinely handled the flights, replacing the Douglas DC-8 types that flew previously. The aircraft flew with an Air Jamaica callsign of "Jamaica".

History 
The airline was established in  when Airborne Freight Corporation acquired Midwest Air Charter; operations started later that year. Airborne Express, as the airline was initially named, was a wholly owned subsidiary of Airborne Freight Corporation of Seattle. Apart from its core activity of cargo transportation, Airborne Express also performed airframe maintenance services to a number of aircraft types. At  the company had 5,500 employees. In , the company acquired  Boeing 767 aircraft for conversion to freighters.

ABX became a public company on 16 August 2003 as part of the merger of DHL and Airborne, in which DHL kept Airborne's ground operations and spun off its air operations as ABX Air Inc. ABX Air's common shares were traded on the NASDAQ National Market under the ticker symbol ABXA. In early 2007, ABX Air entered an ACMI agreement with All Nippon Airways to begin flying freight within Asia. The contract utilized two Boeing 767-200SF aircraft. In March 2007, the airline had 7,600 employees.

On 2 November 2007, CEO Joe Hete and the ABX Air board of directors announced that the company had entered into an agreement to acquire Cargo Holdings International, the parent company of Air Transport International (ATI) and Capital Cargo International Airlines for a cost of $350 million. The transaction was finalized on 31 December 2007, and ABX Air was reorganized as a subsidiary of a holding company, later named Air Transport Services Group (ATSG).

On November 10, 2008, ABX Air's largest customer, DHL, announced a plan to exit the United States domestic market. Previous plans by DHL had been to keep its U.S. operations by contracting them out to United Parcel Service. On 30 March 2010, ABX Air's parent company, ATSG, entered into new long-term agreements with DHL, under which ABX Air would continue providing airlift for the U.S. portion of DHL’s international network.

Fleet 

The ABX Air fleet consists of the following aircraft (updated at November 2020):

Historic fleet
ABX Air operated the following equipment throughout its history:

McDonnell Douglas DC-8-61
McDonnell Douglas DC-8-62
McDonnell Douglas DC-8-63
McDonnell Douglas DC-8-63F
McDonnell Douglas DC-9-15
McDonnell Douglas DC-9-31
McDonnell Douglas DC-9-32
McDonnell Douglas DC-9-32F
McDonnell Douglas DC-9-33F
McDonnell Douglas DC-9-41
NAMC YS-11A-200

Incidents and accidents 

On December 22, 1996, an Airborne Express DC-8-63F operating as Flight 827 conducted a test flight after undergoing modifications at Piedmont Triad International Airport. While performing a stall test the airplane entered into a real stall and the flight crew was unable to recover before it crashed into mountainous terrain near Narrows, Virginia. All six occupants were killed.

On June 29, 2008, a Boeing 767 parked at San Francisco International Airport was damaged beyond repair by a fire that broke out as it was being prepared for flight. An investigation by the NTSB revealed that a design fault was to blame for the fire, allowing a short circuit between electric wiring and an electrically conductive component of the oxygen system.

References

Sources

External links 

ABX Air SEC Filings

1980 establishments in Ohio
Airlines based in Ohio
Airlines established in 1980
American companies established in 1980
Cargo airlines of the United States
Companies based in Ohio